61st Cavalry Regiment may refer to: 
61st Cavalry Regiment (India)
61st Cavalry Regiment (United States)